Alonzo "Skip" Thomas (February 7, 1950 – July 24, 2011), nicknamed "Dr. Death",  was an American football cornerback who played in the National Football League (NFL).

College career
Thomas was awarded a scholarship to play football at Arizona Western Junior College. Then, Thomas played college football at the University of Southern California.

Professional career
Thomas played for the Oakland Raiders for the entire duration of his professional football career between 1972 and 1977.  He had back-to-back six-interception seasons in 1974 and 1975. Although it is commonly believed that his fierce tackling got him the nickname "Doctor Death," the truth (per John Madden's book Hey, Wait a Minute (I Wrote A Book!)) is that Hall of Fame lineman Bob "Boomer" Brown, when he first met him, thought that he looked like the cartoon character "Dr. Death," and the moniker stuck.
Thomas died of a heart attack on July 24, 2011.  He was 61.

References

1950 births
2011 deaths
American football cornerbacks
Arizona Western Matadors football players
Oakland Raiders players
People from Higginsville, Missouri
Players of American football from Missouri
Sportspeople from the Kansas City metropolitan area
USC Trojans football players